Opium Season is the true story of a young American in Afghanistan running an aid program to counter the opium trade.

Plot 
Joel Hafvenstein signed up for a year in Afghanistan in the heart of the country's opium trade, running an American-funded aid program to help thousands of opium poppy farmers make a legal living, and to win hearts and minds away from the former Taliban government. The author was soon caught up in the machinations of Helmand's drug trafficking warlords.

Sources
 Official book site
 More about the book, Opium Season
 The New York Times book review
 On Line Opinion - Australia book review 
 Joel Hafvenstein video interview on The Interviewpoint: part 1, part 2

References

2007 books
Works about opium
Opium in Afghanistan
Books about Afghanistan